Micropera, commonly known as dismal orchids or 小囊兰属 (xiao nang lan shu) is a genus of about twenty species of flowering plants from the orchid family, Orchidaceae. Plants in this genus are large epiphytes with thick roots, long, fibrous stems, linear leaves and whitish or yellow, non-resupinate flowers. The sepals and petals are similar to each other and the labellum is shoe-shaped or sac-like and has three lobes. It is found from Tibet to tropical Asia and the western Pacific Ocean.

Description
Short flowering stems emerge oppose the leaves bearing non-resupinate, whitish, pink or yellowish flowers. The sepals and petals are narrow, fleshy and similar to and free from each other. The labellum is shoe-shaped or sac-like with a prominent spur near its base and has three lobes. The side lobes are broad and erect.

Taxonomy and naming
The genus Micropera was first formally described in 1832 by John Lindley and the description was published in Edwards's Botanical Register. The name Micropera is derived from the Ancient Greek words mikros meaning "small" or "little" and pera meaning "pouch" or "wallet".

Distribution
Species of Micropera are found from the Himalayas to China, Malaysia, Indonesia, the Philippines, New Guinea, the Solomon Islands and Australia.

Species list
The following is a list of Micropera species accepted by the World Checklist of Selected Plant Families as at December 2018:

 Micropera callosa (Blume) Garay - Borneo, Sumatra, Java
 Micropera cochinchinensis (Rchb.f.) Tang & F.T.Wang - Vietnam
 Micropera costulata (J.J.Sm.) Garay - Sumatra
 Micropera draco (Tuyama) P.J.Cribb & Ormerod - Micronesia
 Micropera edanoi Ormerod - Philippines
 Micropera fasciculata (Lindl.) Garay - Queensland, New Guinea, New Caledonia, Solomons
 Micropera fuscolutea (Lindl.) Garay - Malaysia, Borneo
 Micropera loheri (L.O.Williams) Garay - Luzon
 Micropera mannii  (Hook.f.) Tang & F.T.Wang - Assam, Bhutan
 Micropera obtusa (Lindl.) Tang & F.T.Wang - Assam, India, Bhutan, Nepal, Myanmar, Thailand
 Micropera pallida (Roxb.) Lindl. - Assam, India, Bhutan, Nepal, Myanmar, Thailand, Cambodia, Laos, Vietnam, Malaysia, Borneo, Sumatra, Java
 Micropera philippinensis  (Lindl.) Garay - Philippines
 Micropera poilanei (Guillaumin) Garay - Hainan, Vietnam
 Micropera proboscidea (J.J.Sm.) Garay - Malaysia, Sumatra
 Micropera rostrata (Roxb.) N.P.Balakr. - Arunachal Pradesh, Assam, Bangladesh
 Micropera secunda (Rolfe) Tang & F.T.Wang - Myanmar
 Micropera sheryliae P.O'Byrne & J.J.Verm. - Malaysia
 Micropera sterrophylla (Schltr.) Garay - Sulawesi
 Micropera thailandica (Seidenf. & Smitinand) Garay - Thailand, Vietnam
 Micropera tibetica X.H.Jin & Y.J.Lai – Tibet
 Micropera uncinata (Teijsm. & Binn.) Garay - Java
 Micropera utriculosa (Ames) Gara - Philippines

See also
 List of Orchidaceae genera

References

 
Vandeae genera